Zalakeh-ye Hajj Abbas Qoli (also Romanized as Zālakeh-ye Ḩājj ‘Abbās Qolī and Z̄ālkeh-ye Ḩājj ‘Abbās Qolī; also known as ‘Abbās Qolī, Dālakeh-ye Ḩājj ‘Abbās Qolī, Deh ‘Azīz, Z̄ālakeh-ye Ḩājī, and Z̄ālkeh-ye Ḩājjī) is a village in Mahidasht Rural District, Mahidasht District, Kermanshah County, Kermanshah Province, Iran. At the 2006 census, its population was 97, in 22 families.

References 

Populated places in Kermanshah County